Adriano Fabiano Rossato (born 27 August 1977 in Vila Velha, Espírito Santo) is a Brazilian retired footballer who played as a left back, and is a manager.

Football career
During his Brazilian career, free kick specialist Rossato represented Botafogo de Futebol e Regatas, Rio Branco Atlético Clube, Criciúma Esporte Clube, Associação Atlética Portuguesa (RJ), União Agrícola Barbarense Futebol Clube and Marília Atlético Clube, moving to Portugal in July 2002 with Madeira's C.D. Nacional. During two seasons he scored an impressive 17 Primeira Liga goals, including a hat-trick against S.C. Beira-Mar on 25 April 2004 (3–0 home win).

Bought by FC Porto in July 2004, Rossato never played an official game for the northerners. He then joined La Liga side Real Sociedad, scoring – from a free kick – in only his second season appearance, a 1–2 loss at Sevilla FC, finishing with 22 matches.

For 2005–06, Rossato was loaned back to Portugal, signing with S.C. Braga on a one-year deal. Having returned to Sociedad for the following campaign he returned, again on loan, to the Iberian neighbours, moving to U.D. Leiria in January 2007.

Released in the summer of 2007, Rossato joined second division team Málaga CF, being instrumental in the Andalusians' 2008 top flight return after a two-year absence. He would miss, however, the vast majority of the next season due to injury; his first match took place only on 17 May 2009, as he played the second half of a 1–2 away loss to Sporting de Gijón (12 minutes played).

Because of his injuries, Málaga announced in July 2009 it would not renew Rossato's contract, so the player was released. Late in the following month the 32-year-old signed for another club in the country, second level's UD Salamanca.

References

External links

El Mundo stats 

1977 births
Living people
Brazilian footballers
Association football defenders
Campeonato Brasileiro Série A players
Botafogo de Futebol e Regatas players
Rio Branco Atlético Clube players
Criciúma Esporte Clube players
Associação Atlética Portuguesa (RJ) players
Marília Atlético Clube players
Comercial Futebol Clube (Ribeirão Preto) players
Primeira Liga players
C.D. Nacional players
FC Porto players
S.C. Braga players
U.D. Leiria players
La Liga players
Segunda División players
Real Sociedad footballers
Málaga CF players
UD Salamanca players
Brazilian expatriate footballers
Expatriate footballers in Portugal
Expatriate footballers in Spain
Brazilian expatriate sportspeople in Portugal
Brazilian expatriate sportspeople in Spain
Brazilian football managers
Campeonato Brasileiro Série D managers
Desportiva Ferroviária managers